Thomas Bach  (born 29 December 1953) is a German lawyer, former Olympic foil fencer and Olympic gold medalist, serving as the ninth and current president of the International Olympic Committee since 10 September 2013. He is also a former member of the German Olympic Sports Confederation's executive board. Bach is the first ever Olympic champion to be elected President of the IOC.

Early life and education
Thomas Bach was born in 1953 in Würzburg, West Germany. He grew up in Tauberbischofsheim, where he lived with his parents until 1977. Bach earned a doctor of law (Dr. iur. utr.) degree in 1983 from the University of Würzburg. He speaks fluent French, English, Spanish, and German.

Fencing career
Bach is a former foil fencer who competed for West Germany. He won a team gold medal at the 1976 Summer Olympics, as well as silver, gold, and bronze team medals at the 1973, 1977 and 1979 world championships, respectively. He completed his last match on 26 October 1980 in Shanghai.

On 11 November 2017, Bach was formally granted the use of the post-nominal letters "OLY".

DOSB presidency

Bach served as the President of the German Olympic Sports Confederation (DOSB), prior to becoming President of the International Olympic Committee (IOC). He resigned as the head of the DOSB on 16 September 2013, having served as President since 2006.  He was replaced by Alfons Hörmann, and remained a member of the DOSB Executive Board. Additionally, he resigned as the head of Ghorfa Arab-German Chamber of Commerce and Industry. Bach will however continue to serve as the head of Michael Weinig AG Company, a company in the industrial woodworking machinery industry that has its headquarters in Bach's hometown of Tauberbischofsheim, Germany.

In 2012, Bach headed Munich's bid for the 2018 Winter Olympics. In the host city election, Munich secured 25 votes as Pyeongchang was elected as host city with 63 votes.

IOC presidency

On 9 May 2013, Bach confirmed that he would run for President of the International Olympic Committee.

2013 IOC presidential election
Bach was elected to an eight-year term as IOC President at the 125th IOC Session in Buenos Aires on 10 September 2013. He secured 49 votes in the final round of voting, giving him the majority needed to be elected. He succeeds Jacques Rogge who served as IOC President from 2001 to 2013. Bach will be eligible to run for a second four-year term at the 134th IOC Session in 2019 until 2025.

Bach's successful election came against five other candidates, Sergey Bubka, Richard Carrión, Ng Ser Miang, Denis Oswald and Wu Ching-Kuo. The result of the election was as follows:

Bach officially moved into the IOC presidential office at the IOC headquarters in Lausanne, Switzerland, on 17 September 2013, a week after being elected president.

At a meeting of the 137th session of the International Olympic Committee on 10 March 2021, Bach was re-elected to an additional four-year term as President.
Bach, 67, was re-elected by a 93-1 vote from 94 valid votes during the session which was held virtually. This will be Bach's final term as IOC President, as IOC rules limits the president's term to eight years with one renewal of four years.

Olympic Agenda 2020

Following his election as IOC President, Bach stated that he wished to change the Olympic bidding process and make sustainable development a priority. He stated that he felt that the current bidding process asks "too much, too early". These proposed reforms became known as Olympic Agenda 2020. These forty proposed reforms were all unanimously approved at the 127th IOC Session in Monaco.

Olympic host city elections
The first bidding process over which Thomas Bach presided as President was the bidding process for the 2022 Winter Olympics. Bids were due in November 2013 and the host city, Beijing was elected to host the 2022 Winter Olympics at the 128th IOC Session in Kuala Lumpur, Malaysia, in July 2015. Lausanne was elected to host the 2020 Winter Youth Olympics during that same session.

During the bidding process for the 2024 Summer Olympics, President Bach proposed a joint awarding of the 2024 and 2028 Summer Olympics after several bidders withdrew. The IOC later approved a plan to award the 2024 Olympics to Paris with Los Angeles securing the right to host the 2028 Olympics. President Bach presided over the elections where Paris was elected to host the 2024 Summer Olympics and Los Angeles was elected to host the 2028 Summer Olympics at the 131st IOC Session in Lima, Peru. Both cities were unanimously elected.

Milan-Cortina d'Ampezzo was elected to host the 2026 Winter Olympics at the 134th IOC Session in Lausanne, Switzerland. The full IOC membership will elect the host city at the 134th IOC Session in Lausanne, home of the International Olympic Committee.

Russian doping
One of the biggest challenges President Bach has been faced with as IOC President is having to deal with Russia's state-sponsored doping scandal. This program did begin prior to his presidency, but nonetheless it has become a pressing issue during his tenure. It had been discovered that Russia tampered with the anti-doping lab at the 2014 Winter Olympics in Sochi and that the government had sanctioned doping amongst the Russian Olympic athletes for many years. Speaking at the Opening Ceremonies of the 2018 Winter Olympics, his call to "respect the rules and stay clean" was widely interpreted as a reference to the Russian scandal. Bach was harshly criticized for what many see as turning a blind eye to Russia's state-sponsored Olympic doping effort. Jim Walden, attorney for Dr. Grigory Rodchenkov, called Bach's move to reinstate the Russian Olympic Committee following the 2018 Winter Olympics despite the failed drug tests during the Games, "weakness in the face of evil".

COVID-19 pandemic
On 5 March 2020, Bloomberg News reported that Bach said "Neither the word ‘cancellation’ nor the word ‘postponement’ was even mentioned" regarding the 2020 Summer Olympics to respond to the COVID-19 pandemic at the IOC’s executive board meeting the previous day. On 22 March 2020, the IOC announced that within four weeks a decision would be made on whether Tokyo 2020 will be staged as planned or whether a rescheduling is necessary. Canada announced its withdrawal from the Games later that day, and Australia did the same on 23 March in protest against the IOC's refusal to postpone the Olympics in light of the pandemic. Later in the month, the IOC announced the unprecedented postponement of the Olympics until 23 July - 8 August 2021.

Criticism 
Bach was criticised by Marina Hyde in The Guardian for comparing the IOC positively to FIFA with regard to corruption. Also in The Guardian, Owen Gibson accused Bach of hypocrisy for agreeing to be involved with the 2015 European Games hosted in Azerbaijan. Twenty-nine journalists signed an open letter to Bach calling for him to condemn Azerbaijan's jailing of dissenters and attacks on freedom of expression.

In 2017 Bach faced a backlash in his decision to rename synchronized swimming as artistic swimming. The name change spurred a petition signed by over 11,000 people from 88 countries with one signitary declaring "'Artistic Swimming' sounds like something society ladies did with their bosom friends at garden parties or after tea in the early 20th century."

While Bach was in Tokyo in July 2021 to promote a safe launch of the postponed 2020 Summer Olympics, Bach referred to the Japanese people as "Chinese", triggering a backlash on social media. Bach's visit to Hiroshima Peace Memorial Park was opposed by survivor groups, some of which accused Bach of using the atomic bombing politically to "justify holding of the Olympics by force under the pandemic". Furthermore, the Hiroshima prefectural and municipal governments had to cover some 3.79 million yen (roughly $34,000) in security costs for Bach after the IOC refused to pay. As The Washington Post had called him "Von Ripper-off", the translated term "" became his nickname, and made the top 10 in 2021's Buzzwords of the Year in Japan.

Also in 2021, Chinese tennis star Peng Shuai was suspected have been forcibly disappeared after she accused Zhang Gaoli, a top official of the Chinese Communist Party (CCP), of sexual assault. Following international outcry, the CCP offered an apparent "proof-of-life" video. Bach served as an interviewer in the video, in which Peng stated that she was safe and well. Zhang and Bach had met and worked together on the Beijing 2022 Winter Olympics. After the interview, Global Athlete, an athlete advocacy group, said the IOC had demonstrated "an abhorrent indifference to sexual violence and the well-being of female athletes". Peng attended several events at the 2022 Winter Olympics, and had a meeting with Bach and other IOC officials, where Peng said she intended to travel to Europe after the COVID-19 pandemic.

Honours

State honours
 :
  Grand Cross of the Order of the Phoenix
:
 1st Class of the Order of Merit of the Republic of Poland
 :
  Blue Dragon (Cheongnyong) of the Order of Sports Merit
 :
  Grand Cordon of the Order of Merit (2016)

Honorary doctorates
 : Doctorate honoris causa from the Universidad Católica de Murcia.
 : Honorary Doctorate from the University of Tsukuba.

Awards
 Seoul Peace Prize from the Republic of Korea

Notes and references

External links

 
 
 
 

1953 births
Living people
Presidents of the International Olympic Committee
International Olympic Committee members
German male fencers
Olympic fencers of West Germany
Olympic gold medalists for West Germany
Olympic medalists in fencing
Fencers at the 1976 Summer Olympics
Medalists at the 1976 Summer Olympics
Commanders Crosses of the Order of Merit of the Federal Republic of Germany
Recipients of the Order of Merit of Baden-Württemberg
Recipients of the Order of Prince Yaroslav the Wise, 4th class
Doping in Russia
People from Tauberbischofsheim
Sportspeople from Stuttgart (region)